The Reprieve: An Episode in the Life of Abraham Lincoln was a 1908 film that included US President Abraham Lincoln pardoning a sleeping sentry. It is possibly the first motion picture based on his life.

See also
Abraham Lincoln cultural depictions

External links

Fictional depictions of Abraham Lincoln in film
1908 films
American black-and-white films
American silent short films
1908 drama films
1900s American films
Silent American drama films